Admiral Piyal De Silva, WWV & Bar, RWP, RSP, VSV, USP is a former senior Sri Lankan naval officer. He was the Commander of the Sri Lankan Navy from 2019 to 2020.

Education
Educated at Dharmasoka College, in Ambalangoda he joined the navy in 1984.

Naval career
De Silva joined the Sri Lanka Navy as an Officer Cadet in the 12th intake in 1984 undergoing basic training at the Naval and Maritime Academy. On completion of his basic training at the Naval and Maritime Academy, he was commissioned as a Sub Lieutenant in February 1986. During his early career he specialized as an explosive ordnance disposal diver going on to command the elite Special Boat Squadron and the Diving Unit of the Navy. An officer of the executive branch he held sea commands as Captain of several warships. He later gained a Master of Business Administration in Human Resource Management, a Master of Defence and Strategic Studies and graduated from the PLA National Defence University.

He was promoted to the rank of Rear Admiral in 2012 and held appointments such as Flag Officer Commanding Naval Fleet, Commander Eastern, Southern, North-western and Northern Naval areas.

President Maithripala Sirisena appointed De Silva the Chief of Staff of the Sri Lanka Navy with effect from 2 July 2018. Prior to this appointment, he served as the Deputy Chief of Staff and Director General Operations. On 31 December 2018, he was appointed by President Sirisena as Commander of the Navy and promoted to the rank of Vice Admiral effective from 1 January 2019. He retired from the navy on 14 July 2020 and was promoted to the rank of Admiral.

His decorations include  Weera Wickrama Vibhushanaya twice, Rana Wickrama Padakkama, Rana Sura Padakkama for gallantry; Vishista Seva Vibhushanaya and Uttama Seva Padakkama for meritorious service.

Sporting career
De Silva was adjudged the Best Sportsman of the Sri Lanka Navy on two occasions and represented the Sri Lankan national basketball team at South Asian and Asian Basketball Tournaments.

Family
De Silva is married to Arundathi Jayaneththi and they have two sons.

References

External links
Navy Bio

Commanders of the Navy (Sri Lanka)
Living people
Sinhalese military personnel
Sri Lankan admirals
Year of birth missing (living people)
Sri Lankan underwater divers
Special Boat Squadron (Sri Lanka) officers